Aleighcia Scott is a Welsh–Jamaican reggae artist and presenter currently working for the BBC. She is the current host of Thursday Evenings on BBC Radio Wales. Scott is also a reggae singer.

Early life
Scott was born in Cardiff, Wales. She has family roots in Trelawny, Jamaica.

Career

Music 
Scott is a reggae artist who has worked with the likes of Salaam Remi (producer of Amy Winehouse & Fugees) and released music on the label, Pecking Records.

Scott released her debut EP Forever in Love in April 2018.

Radio 
In March 2022 Scott was confirmed as the presenter of the new BBC Radio Wales evening show on Thursdays. Joining alongside Scott was, Huw Stephens hosting the evening show Monday to Wednesday.

During Christmas 2022, Scott was to present a special Christmas programme for BBC Radio Wales, A Very Reggae Christmas with Aleighcia Scott on Saturday 24 December at 18:00.

References

External links
Aleighcia Scott (BBC Radio Wales)

Living people
Welsh women musicians
Welsh radio presenters
Welsh women radio presenters
BBC Radio Wales presenters
Year of birth missing (living people)